Kennethmont (archaically Kinnethmont, or Kirkhill of Kennethmont) is a village in the Marr area of Aberdeenshire, Scotland, approximately  south of Huntly.

It has a population of approximately 470 people. Kennethmont children attend Kennethmont Primary School and the Gordon Schools, Huntly.

It is part of West Aberdeenshire constituency.

Transport
The B9002 road runs through the village, connecting to Insch to the east and to the A97 road between Huntly and Alford to the west.

The Aberdeen to Inverness railway runs through Kennethmont, but there is no station, Kennethmont railway station having closed in 1968.

Notable buildings
Leith Hall is a country house built in 1650 and now maintained by the National Trust for Scotland.

Ardmore distillery is a single malt discovery located to the east of the village.

See also
List of listed buildings in Kennethmont, Aberdeenshire

Notable residents
William Milne (1785–1822), missionary, was born near Kennethmont.
Very Rev Alexander Yule (1830–1907), Moderator of the Presbyterian Church for all Australia, was born in Kennethmont.
Robert Fraser (1858–1914), bishop, was born in Kennethmont.
Tom Kennedy (1874–1954), British politician, was born in Kennethmont.

References

External links
Visionofbritain.org

Villages in Aberdeenshire